Farmers' Day is an annual observance in various countries to celebrate the national contributions of farmers and agriculturers. In India it is observed on December 23.

List by country

Afghanistan 

In Afghanistan, it is observed on March 22 every year as part of the Afghan New Year (Nowruz).

Ghana 

The National Farmers' Day in Ghana is an annual celebration of farmers and fishermen, observed on the first Friday of December. On Farmers' Day, the Ministry of Food and Agriculture (Ghana) honors with special awards to deserving farmers and fishermen based on their practices and output.

India 
The National Farmers Day in India is also known as Kisan Divas in Hindi. Farmer's Day is celebrated every year on 23 December, on the birthday of the 5th Prime Minister of India, Choudhary Charan Singh, also a farmer's leader, who introduced many policies to improve the lives of the Indian farmers. It is celebrated by organising various programs, debates, seminars, quiz competitions, discussions, workshops, exhibitions, essays writing competitions and functions.

Pakistan 
The National Farmers' Day in Pakistan, also known as Kissan Day, was celebrated for the first time in the country's history on 18 December 2019 in Islamabad as was also acknowledged by the Prime Minister Imran Khan. The idea was proposed by Pakistan's leading Fertilizer manufacturing company Fatima Group in favor of promoting farmer welfare and prosperity while celebrating Pakistan's first farmers' day on 18 December 2019 during a special event in Islamabad which was acknowledged and endorsed by the Country's premier.

South Korea 
In South Korea, the observance is on 11 November. It competes with the Pepero Day on the same day.

United States 
In America, it is observed on 12 October every year. It is celebrated to pay tribute to all farmers throughout American history.

Vietnam 
In Vietnam, it is observed on 14 October every year as the anniversary of the foundation of Vietnamese Peasants' Society. It was formerly observed on 26 March (the same date as the Youth Day in North (hence, reunified) Vietnam) in South Vietnam from 1971 until 1975 to commemorate Nguyễn Văn Thiệu's passing on Land Reforms Act of 1970.

Zambia

The National Farmers' Day in Zambia is observed on the first Monday Of August.

See also 

 World Food Day
 World Students Day
 World Chocolate Day
 World Music Day

References 

Agriculture in society
October observances
Public holidays in Ghana